MSTP may stand for:
 MAGTF Staff Training Program
 Medical Scientist Training Program
 Microsoft Manual of Style for Technical Publications
 Multiple Spanning Tree Protocol
 Mesh Semantic Transfer Protocol